Sir John Bourne (by 1518 – May 1575), of Worcestershire, was an English politician.

Family
Bourne's family were minor gentry from Worcestershire. He married Dorothy Lygon and they had two sons and three daughters.

Career
He was educated at Lincoln's Inn and was knighted on 2 October 1553. He was a Member (MP) of the Parliament of England for Guildford in 1539, Midhurst in 1542, Preston in 1545, Worcester in October 1553, and Worcestershire in April 1554, November 1554, 1555 and 1558.

References

1575 deaths
Members of the Parliament of England for Worcestershire
Year of birth uncertain
English MPs 1539–1540
English MPs 1542–1544
English MPs 1545–1547
English MPs 1553 (Mary I)
English MPs 1554
English MPs 1554–1555
English MPs 1555
English MPs 1558